Gary Savage may refer to:

 Gary Savage (cricketer) (born 1978), South African-born Argentine cricketer
 Gary Savage (hurler) (born 1981), Irish hurler
 Dr. Gary Savage, a Deus Ex character